Cima de Nomnom is a mountain of the Lepontine Alps, loverlooking Cauco in the Swiss canton of Graubünden. It lies on the range between the Val Calanca and the Val Mesolcina, north of Piz de Groven.

References

External links
 Cima de Nomnom on Hikr

Mountains of the Alps
Mountains of Switzerland
Mountains of Graubünden
Lepontine Alps
Two-thousanders of Switzerland
Calanca